Effiong Nsungusi Junior (born 4 November 1999) is a Nigerian professional football who plays as a forward for Danish football club HB Køge.

Career 
Nsungusi started his career with Ghanaian club International Allies in January 2018. He played 17 matches and scored 4 goals before leaving the club to join HB Køge.

References

External links 

1999 births
Living people
Nigerian footballers
Association football forwards
Nigerian expatriate footballers
International Allies F.C. players
HB Køge players
Ghana Premier League players
Expatriate men's footballers in Denmark
Danish 1st Division players
Nigerian expatriate sportspeople in Denmark
Nigerian expatriate sportspeople in Ghana